Salahaddin SC is an Iraqi football team based in Tikrit.

Honours

Major
Iraqi Premier League
Champions (1): 1982–83

Minor
Al-Wehdat Championship
Winners (1): 1983
Rovers Cup
Winners (1): 1982

Notable head coaches

 Wathik Naji
 Douglas Aziz
 Basim Qasim

References

External links
 Club page on Goalzz

1975 establishments in Iraq
Association football clubs established in 1975
Football clubs in Saladin